Gianni Di Gregorio (born 19 February 1949) is an Italian director, screenwriter and actor.

Life and career 
Born in Rome, Di Gregorio trained as a stage actor and director in the Drama School of Alessandro Fersen. He started his professional career as a screenwriter in the second half of the 1980s.

In the 1990s Di Gregorio started collaborating with Matteo Garrone as a screenwriter, an actor and an assistant director, their most famous work being the 2008 award winning film Gomorrah. He made his directorial debut in 2008, with the critically acclaimed Mid-August Lunch, which he also wrote and starred; he followed that up with three other films in the same vein The Salt of Life (2011), Good for Nothing (2014) & Citizen of the World (2019).

Filmography 

 Giovanni Senzapensieri (1986, co-writer)
 Sembra morto... ma è solo svenuto (1986, co-writer)
 Stazione di servizio (1989, co-writer, 2 episodes)
 Affetti speciali (1989, co-writer) 
 Naufraghi sotto costa (1991, co-writer)
 Ospiti (1998, actor as Giacomo)
 Estate romana (2000, actor as Lodeger)
 Viva la scimmia (2002, co-writer)
 Gomorrah (2008, co-writer) 
 Mid-August Lunch (2008, director and co-writer) 
 The Salt of Life (2011, director and co-writer)
 Good for Nothing (2014, director and co-writer)
 Citizen of the World (2019, director and co-writer)

References

External links 
 

1949 births
20th-century Italian people
Living people
European Film Award for Best Screenwriter winners
Italian film directors
Italian male film actors
Italian male screenwriters
Italian screenwriters
Film people from Rome